Philippon is a French surname. Notable people with the surname include:

Antoine Philippon (born 1989), French footballer
Louis Philipon de La Madelaine, (1734–1818), French writer
Armand Philippon (1761–1836), French general
Charles Philipon (1800–1861), 
Thomas Philippon, (born 1974),  French economist
Antoine Philippon (born 1989), French footballer
Philippe Basiron (1449-1491), French composer sometimes called Philippon

French-language surnames